Xinxing County, alternately romanized as Sunhing, is a county of the prefecture-level city of Yunfu in the west of Guangdong province, China.

History
xin xing county formally established in the third year of da ye era, Sui dynasty (607 CE). 
Under the Qing, Xinxing County was administered as part of the commandery of Zhaoqing.
 
Notable people:

 Huineng (惠能) (638–713): sixth ancestor of Chan 

 Cheung Chu (張珠) (1892–1950)： entrepreneur of Malaysia 

 Gabriel Sun Shou Kin (孫秀乾)： grew up in Hong Kong, now is an entrepreneur of Australia

 Su Shuhui (苏树辉）(1951–)： Macao politician also a calligrapher

Climate

Notes

References

Citations

Bibliography
 , reprinted 2000.

County-level divisions of Guangdong
Yunfu